is a concert hall located in Shōwa-ku, Nagoya, Japan.

It was constructed in commemoration of the marriage of Emperor Hirohito and was opened on October 10, 1930. It is often used as a boxing venue.

References

External links
  

Sports venues in Nagoya
Tsuruma Park
Concert halls in Japan
Buildings and structures in Nagoya
1930 establishments in Japan
Music venues completed in 1930